Lavareda is a genus of nematodes belonging to the family Rhadinematidae.

The species of this genus are found in New Zealand.

Species:

Lavareda coronatus 
Lavareda decraemerae 
Lavareda iramscotti

References

Nematodes